Avathuvadi is a town in Krishnagiri District, Tamil Nadu, India. The town is governed by a gram panchayat.

The main temples of the village are a Pillayar temple and a Mariamman temple. Pongal and Masi Maham are the major festivals celebrated in the village.

Villages in Krishnagiri district